Ahmed Osman (born January 1, 1988) is an American long-distance runner. In 2019, he competed in the men's marathon at the 2019 World Athletics Championships held in Doha, Qatar. He finished in 23rd place.

In 2019, he also competed in the London Marathon held in London, United Kingdom. He did not finish his race.

References

External links
 
 
 

Living people
1988 births
Place of birth missing (living people)
American male long-distance runners
American male marathon runners
World Athletics Championships athletes for the United States
21st-century American people